Joseph-Victor Monfette (October 13, 1841 – September 16, 1924) was a farmer and political figure in Quebec. He represented Nicolet in the Legislative Assembly of Quebec as a member of the Parti National.

He was born in Saint-Pierre-les-Becquets, Canada East, the son of Jean-Baptiste Monfet and Rosalie Gagnon. Monfette was a justice of the peace and owned a farm at Sainte-Sophie-de-Lévrard. Monfette was married twice: to Elmire Tousignant in 1866 and to Célina Legendre (née Pépin) in 1901. He was mayor of Sainte-Sophie-de-Lévrard from 1882 to 1890, from 1896 to 1901 and from 1910 to 1913. He died in Sainte-Sophie-de-Lévrard at the age of 82.

References
 

Quebec Liberal Party MNAs
Mayors of places in Quebec
1841 births
1924 deaths